Marcelo Spina (born July 23, 1970) is an Argentinean-American architect (AIA) and educator. He is a partner in PATTERNS, which is a Los Angeles-based architecture firm. He founded PATTERNS in 2002. Since 2001, he has been a Design and Applied Studies Faculty at the Southern California Institute of Architecture, SCI-Arc.

Education
In 1994, he graduated with a B.Arch. from the National University of Rosario in Argentina. In 1997, he received a Master in Advanced Architectural Design from the Graduate School of Architecture, Planning and Preservation of Columbia University in New York.

Career
Spina’s previous employers include Gerardo Caballero Architects, RUR Architects and Keller Easterling in New York. In 1998, he opened his own office Banchini + Spina Arquitectos in Rosario, Argentina. From 2005 to 2009, he served as the coordinator of the Applied Studies Program at SCI-Arc and from 2011 to 2019, as the Architectural Technologies Postgraduate Program. He became a member of the Board of Trustees in 2016.

He has served on national juries and advisory boards such as the Architectural League of New York, Progressive Architecture Awards and the Mies Crown Hall Americas Prize. He has been a Visiting Professor at the Universities of Pennsylvania, Harvard, Vienna, Innsbruck, Di Tella, and Syracuse among others. Spina was the Louis I. Kahn Visiting Assistant Professor of Architectural Design at Yale University School of Architecture in 2013.

Spina co-authored PATTERNS Embedded (ACDCU, 2010), Material Beyond Materials (SCI-Arc Press 2012)  and Mute Icons and other Dichotomies of the Real in Architecture (Princeton 2016). He is co-curator of Matters of Sensation at Artists Space with Georgina Huljich.

Projects
 Jujuy Redux Apartment in Rosario, Argentina (2012)
 Prism Gallery in Los Angeles, California (2009)
 Zhixin Hybrid office building in Chengdu, China (2010)
 FYF Residence in Rosario, Argentina (2009)
 League of Shadows even structure in Los Angeles, California (2013)
 MOCA Textile Room Pavilion, Los Angeles, CA (2012)
 The White Album Performance, New York, NY & Los Angeles, CA (2019)
 Land Tiles Temporary Installation, Los Angeles, CA (2003)
 Snake-Rice Sculpture, Icheon, South Korea (2003)
 Jujuy 2056 Apartment in Rosario, Argentina (2003)

Awards and recognition
2019: AIA LA Merit Award, Casa del Sol, Mykonos
2017: AIA LA Merit Award, Janoian Medical Building, Glendale, CA
2016: AIA LA Merit Award, Victory Healthcare, North Hollywood, CA
2015: ACSA Faculty Award, Toronto, Canada
2014: American Architecture Award, The Chicago Athenaeum, Jujuy Redux, with MSA
2013: United States Artists Grigor Fellow, Los Angeles
2012: Honorable Mention, Jujuy Redux, AIA Annual Design Review AIA LA Merit Award, Jujuy Redux, Rosario, Argentina AIA LA Honor Award, Collective Void Dormitory, Puerto Rico First Prize, SCI-Arc Graduation Pavilion Competition, Los Angeles, CA
2011: Emerging Voices, Architectural League of New York, NY
2008: Graham Foundation Grant, "Matters of Sensation" Artists Space, New York, NY
2007: Honorific Mention, International Competition, Skopje Concert Hall, Skopje, Macedonia
2006: First Prize, Vertical Garden Invited Competition, MAK Center at the Schindler House, Los Angeles, CA)
2004: Design Vanguard Selection, Architectural Record, New York, NY
2003: First Prize, SCI_Arc CafÈ, SCI-Arc Faculty Competition, Los Angeles, CA Third Prize, Young Architect of the Year Award, International Award Competition, Building Design, London, UK
1997: Honor Award for Excellence in Design, Columbia University, GSAPP, New York, NY William Kinne Prize

Among other places, his designs have most notably been exhibited at the Venice Biennale in Italy, MOCA,   The Chicago Biennial,   The MAK Museum, The Art Institute of Chicago, and the San Francisco MOMA.

Books

Mute Icons & other Dichotomies of the Real in Architecture 

Interrogating historical, contemporary, and — more importantly— speculative images, ‘Mute Icons & Other Dichotomies of the Real in Architecture’aims to construct a viable alternative to the icon’s cliché and exhausted form of communication, positing one that is decidedly introverted and withdrawn. Developing a language and a sensibility for discovering simultaneous, contradictory, and even unexpected readings of architectural form, Marcelo Spina & Georgina Huljich / PATTERNS’s new book Mute Icons, aims to carve out a niche in contemporary culture and history by suggesting that far from being a crowd-pleaser, architecture can persist within society as a constructive cultural and social irritant. Part history, part theory, and part monographic atlas, the book includes contributions by Georgina Huljich, Guillermo Martinez, Ciro Najle, Marcelo Spina, Brett Steele, and Constance Vale.

PATTERNS Embedded 

‘Embedded’, PATTERNS’s first comprehensive monograph argues for the need of closer proximity between discipline and practice in architecture by articulating concepts, drawings, projects and buildings. Founded in Los Angeles in 2002 and headed by Argentinean Architects Marcelo Spina and Georgina Huljich, the award-winning practice thoughtful research, innovative mission and collaborative approach moves seamlessly between digital and material expressions. In addition to their material and formal research, built projects include Prism Art Gallery in West Hollywood, FYF Residence and Jujuy Redux both in Rosario (Argentina) and Fluid Core Yard in Chengdu, China as well as small objects, sculptures and installations. The book includes essays by Marcleo Spina, Georgina Huljich, Todd Gannon, Marcelyn Gow.and John Mcmorrough.
Material Beyond Materials: Composite Tectonics: 

There are a multitude of different approaches regarding the application and significance of composites in contemporary design, many of which are represented by the speakers who participated in the SCI-Arc-hosted conference, "Material Beyond Materials-Composite Tectonics”. Organized by Architect and SCI-Arc Faculty Marcelo Spina, the event centered on investigating the relationships that currently exist between technological advances in materials, innovations in the building industry, and contemporary design discourse and pedagogy. Edited by Marcelo Spina and Marcelyn Gow, this book documents one of the largest events ever organized by SCI-Arc and the first one with a direct emphasis on advanced materials and their use in the architecture field.

 Against the Grain:

Against the Grain, features the work of three studios of the Louis I. Kahn Visiting Assistant Professors at Yale. Marcelo Spina and Georgina Huljich in “Brutal Beauty: Piles, Monoliths and the Incongruous Whole” explored ways to make mute icons through monolithic form so that the buildings were foreign to their context and difficult to read formally for a film center in Los Angeles. Dan Wood in “Boulevard Triumphant: ecological infrastructure, architecture, modernization, and the image of the city” a studio for a civic center in Gabon that challenged the architectural language in Africa beyond the clichés and nostalgia to create an architecture that embodied a new ambition. Lisa Gray and Alan Organschi in “Timber Innovation District: new timber technologies and contemporary high performance wood architecture” researched wood as a material for larger-scale projects for a site on New Haven’s working waterfront, with projects ranging from bridges to manufacturing facilities and multi-family housing. Edited by Jackie Kow and Nina Rappaport the book is designed by MGMT.design and is distributed by Actar D.

References

Other website
 Patterns

1970 births
Living people
National University of Rosario alumni
Argentine architects
20th-century American architects
21st-century American architects
People from Rosario, Santa Fe
Columbia University alumni
Argentine emigrants to the United States